Lower East Side Ecology Center, also known as the LES Ecology Center, is an environmental organization founded in 1987, focusing on urban sustainability, providing e-waste and composting services, environmental stewardship opportunities, and educational programming.

E-Waste Warehouse 
In 2003, the Ecology Center started its Electronic Waste (E-Waste) Program focusing on E-waste recycling.

Artists-in-residence 
The E-Waste Warehouse hosts one artist in residence at a time. The artist-in-residence is given studio space in the warehouse and is invited to engage and make art with some of the e-waste the center collects. In 2019–2020, skateboarder and artist Louis Sarowsky was an artist-in-residence at the center. He used the recycled materials in his sculptures and performances, making a body-suit covered in VHS tape.

E-Waste Warehouse Gallery

References

Recycling organizations
Environmental justice in New York City
Recycling in New York City
Waste management infrastructure of New York City
Environmental organizations based in New York City